Yevgeniya Maksimovna Rudneva (24 May 1921 – 9 April 1944) was the head navigator of the 46th Guards Night Bomber Regiment posthumously awarded Hero of the Soviet Union.

Civilian life
Rudneva was born in Berdyansk to the family of a Ukrainian telegrapher; she was an only child. After finishing her seventh year of secondary school in Moscow, where she spent most of her childhood, she went on to study three years as a student in the faculty of mechanics and mathematics of Moscow State University prior to October 1941, when she volunteered for military service. She became a member of the Communist Party in 1943.

World War II
After joining the Red Army in 1941 Rudneva graduated from navigators courses at the Engels Military Aviation School, where she made her first flight on 5 January 1942. In May that year she and all of the other members of what was then the 588th Night Bomber Regiment were deployed to the Southern Front in May 1942. During her career she flew with many pilots, including future Heroes of the Soviet Union Yevdokiya Nikulina and Irina Sebrova.

She flew 645 night combat missions on the old and slow Polikarpov Po-2 biplane, destroying river crossings, troop trains, troops and military equipment of the enemy. During the war she flew on bombing missions on the Transcaucasian, North Caucasian, and 4th Ukrainian fronts as well as in battles for the Taman and Kerch peninsulas.

On the night of 9 April 1944 she was shot down while navigating for Praskovya "Panna" Prokofyeva, one of the new pilots in the regiment.

Personal views
In her letter to professor Sergey Blazhko, head of the Astrometry Department of Moscow State University, dated 19 October 1942, she wrote that the first bomb she had promised the Nazis would be in retaliation for the bombing of the Faculty of Mechanics and Mathematics that winter. She wrote that she was defending the honor of the university.

Awards and honors

Hero of the Soviet Union (26 October 1944)
Order of Lenin (26 October 1944)
Order of the Red Banner (27 April 1943)
Order of the Patriotic War 1st Class (25 October 1943)
Order of the Red Star (9 September 1942)

Monuments to her were built in Moscow, Kerch and the Saltykovka settlement (in Moscow Oblast). The Asteroid 1907 Rudneva, a school in Kerch, streets in Berdyansk, Kerch, Moscow and Saltykovka were named after her.

See also

 List of female Heroes of the Soviet Union

Footnotes

References

Bibliography

External links
Monument to Rudneva in Kerch
Biography on Moscow State University website
Biography on the website warheroes.ru

1921 births
1944 deaths
Soviet women in World War II
Women air force personnel of the Soviet Union
Flight navigators
Soviet Air Force officers
Heroes of the Soviet Union
Moscow State University alumni
Victims of aviation accidents or incidents in the Soviet Union
Ukrainian women in World War II
Russian navigators
Soviet military personnel killed in World War II
Recipients of the Order of Lenin
Recipients of the Order of the Red Banner
People from Berdiansk
Aviators killed by being shot down